Lone Elm is a city in Anderson County, Kansas, United States.  As of the 2020 census, the population of the city was 27.

History
A post office was opened in Lone Elm in 1879, and remained in operation until it was discontinued in 1956.

Circa 1910, Lone Elm had a bank, a dozen retail establishments, and a population of 175.

Geography
Lone Elm is located at  (38.079750, -95.242515).

Demographics

2010 census
As of the census of 2010, there were 25 people, 12 households, and 7 families residing in the city. The racial makeup of the city was 100.0% White.

There were 12 households, of which 33.3% had children under the age of 18 living with them, 50.0% were married couples living together, 8.3% had a female householder with no husband present, and 41.7% were non-families. 41.7% of all households were made up of individuals, and 33.3% had someone living alone who was 65 years of age or older. The average household size was 2.08 and the average family size was 2.71.

The median age in the city was 46.8 years. 24% of residents were under the age of 18; 0.0% were between the ages of 18 and 24; 20% were from 25 to 44; 32% were from 45 to 64; and 24% were 65 years of age or older. The gender makeup of the city was 44.0% male and 56.0% female.

2000 census
As of the census of 2000, there were 27 people, 12 households, and 9 families residing in the city. The racial makeup of the city was 100.00% White. Hispanic or Latino of any race were 3.70% of the population.

There were 12 households, out of which 25.0% had children under the age of 18 living with them, 75.0% were married couples living together, and 25.0% were non-families. 25.0% of all households were made up of individuals, and 16.7% had someone living alone who was 65 years of age or older. The average household size was 2.25 and the average family size was 2.67.

In the city, the population was spread out, with 18.5% under the age of 18, 14.8% from 25 to 44, 33.3% from 45 to 64, and 33.3% who were 65 years of age or older. The median age was 60 years. For every 100 females, there were 107.7 males. For every 100 females age 18 and over, there were 83.3 males.

The median income for a household in the city was $32,500, and the median income for a family was $31,250. Males had a median income of $36,250 versus $0 for females. The per capita income for the city was $18,885. None of the population and none of the families were below the poverty line.

Education
Lone Elm is part of Unified School District 479. The district high school is Crest High School.

Notable people
 John Lintner, financial economist

References

Further reading

External links
 Lone Elm - Directory of Public Officials
 USD 479, school district for Colony, Kincaid, Lone Elm
 Numerous Anderson County documents and photos
 Anderson County map, KDOT

Cities in Anderson County, Kansas
Cities in Kansas